Shmankivtsi is a village in Ukraine, Ternopil Oblast, Chortkiv Raion, Zavodske settlement hromada. It is the administrative center of the former Shmankivska village council. Shmankivtsi includes the hamlet of Strusivka, a former village.

Geography 
Its geographic coordinates are 48° 59' north latitude and 25° 55' east longitude. Yards - 268.

Near the village flows the stream Samets, which flows into the river Nichlava.

Toponymy
Leading specialist in Ukrainian onomastics, Doctor of Philology, Professor of Lviv University  in his monograph "Origin of Ukrainian Carpathian and Carpathian names of settlements (anthroponymic formations)" noted that the original meaning was Shmaykivtsi, meaning 'family or subjects Shmaika'. That is, the original name of the village was Shmaykivtsi, which later grew into Shmankivka due to the pronunciation of the letter y changing to n. A direct analogue of this is the Ukrainian equivalent of the name Shmaiko.

 gives the following variants of the names of the village Shmankivtsi, recorded in chronological order in the relevant sources:
 Szmankowce, s. – Kamyanets Zemstvo Book 1617, 1642;
 Szmankowce, s. – Lifting register 1629, 1650 1661, 1667;
 Szmankowce, s. – General Register 1662;
 Szmankowce, s. – Commissioner's Register 1678;
 Czerminkofce, s. – Boplan.

History

Ancient times 
The medieval period is associated with the discovery of various bronze and silver jewellry, including rings, beads, necklaces, and tiara plaques, dating from the 16th–17th centuries.

Middle Ages and the modern day 
In a multi-volume edition of records which were in the archives of the Bernardine monastery in Lviv, is the first known mention of the village Shmankivtsi. According to the act of July 16, 1449, which was registered in Terebovlia, Zimgund Kerdei received the above-mentioned village.

In 1469 there was a revision of the deeds of possession of property in Russia.

According to the 1563–1564 tax register, an Orthodox church owned by Lyantskoronsky was recorded in Shmankivtsi.

On September 29, 1485, the Polish King and Grand Duke of Lithuania Casimir IV Jagiellon issued a deed confirming the sale by Jan Freder of Pleszewicz to the Buczacki brothers of half the village of Shmankivtsi in Skal County on the Sarnek River for 200 hryvnias and two horses worth 50 hryvnias; the settlement was acquired by the Buczacki brother magnates of the coat of arms of Abdank.

In 1609, the Russian voivode  gave Martin Makovetsky a folwark in Shmankivtsi, the smaller halves that Makovetsky occupied under the right of life from Nikolai Buchatsky.

On February 22, 1610, the Russian voivode and bar elder Stanislav Golsky, having invited the Dominican monks of Shmankivtsi, founded a Dominican monastery with a church called the Blessed Virgin Mary and St. Stanislaus in Chortkiv. The monastery was allocated a large part of the village of Shmankivtsi with rates: the first, Mlynsky; the second, at the Court; the third, Stone; the fourth, Matseyevsky; and the fifth, Demyanovsky.  from Brzez and Jan and Mykola Potocki from Potok also gave the monastery their units in this village. On February 3, 1622, the Dominicans received another piece of Shmankivtsi land as a gift from Jan and Mykola Potocki.

On February 6, 1624, a battle took place near Shmankivtsi between the Polish army under the command of Stanislaw Koniecpolski and the Tatar horde.

On November 26, 1624, Dominican monks from Chortkiv, together with Paweł Kełpiński, a neighbor of the village of Shmankivtsi, decided to build a castle here to defend against the Tatars, which in the next century was dismantled and the material was used to build walls around the church, monastery and garden in Chortkiv. In 1624, all the treasures from the Shmankivtsi monastery were transferred to Chortkiv.

In 1627, Pavel Kelpinsky ceded his estates to the Łuków hunter Martin Makovetsky. In 1644, Gabriel Kelpinsky, son of Martin, ceded his estates to Shmankivtsi, located in Kamianets County, Podil Voivodeship, which he inherited after the death of his brother Paul in its entirety and with all benefits, in favor of Krzysztof Kelpinsky and his legal heirs; all processes on his part were released and the act of donation was confirmed by an oath. In 1653, Vaclav Kelpinsky, son of Stanislaw and brother of Jan Kelpinsky, his estates in the village of Shmankivtsi and other immovable and movable property, which he inherited from his father and mother and from his brother, were ceded to his cousins Adam and Felician Kelpinsky. Claims for those estates were waived and the deed of gift was confirmed by an oath.

On July 26, 1671,  called the village Chernihiv; while here with a military convoy, he noted in his diary that "this village had a castle, which a few days ago, after a long defense, the Tatars stormed and killed all the people, not sparing women and children. The people of Verdum saw the bodies of the slain who had not yet been buried."

In 1672, Gabriel Silnitsky, a castellan from Chernihiv, ceded his estates – the villages of Shmankivtsi and Shmankivchyky – to Stanislav Makovetsky, the Letychiv mayor, and his heirs.

In 1710, a tax on a quarter and a half of the smoke from the village of Shmankivtsi was levied on the maintenance of the garrison in the Okopa Holy Trinity Fortress. In 1724, the noble Józef Potocki donated his estate – part of the village of Shmankivtsi – to the monastery of the Chortkiv Dominicans.

Shmankivtsi's estate was also attacked by the nobility. In particular, the innkeeper cornet player Konstanty Lyantskoronsky, led by two hundred armed men, "maimed two priests and one brother; and Fr. Francis Pieszkowski tied to a horse, ran half a mile". Tomasz Makovecki, a hunter from Lukiv, was no less cruel: his subjects beat the monks, tied them up, put them on a cart and took them out of the village. For these shameful actions, the men received sentences: Lyantskoronsky on December 2, 1740, and Tomasz Makowiecki on December 17, 1754. On December 1, 1755, the Uniate Metropolitan of Kyiv, Galicia, and All Rus Leo Szeptycki announced the excommunication (anathema) of them and their subjects who had taken part in the attacks.

In 1784, construction began on the wooden church of Cosmas and Damian, which was completed in 1785.

In 1785, 561 people lived in the village.

In the early 19th century, the Dominicans owned a farm with more than a hundred hectares of Shmankivtsi land. The farm was wooden. It had large rooms with two vanquiers, shingles, and a floor made of boards; it needed repair, as well as the nearby chapel.

Jan Ksaveriy Mushynsky from Shmankivtsi married Karolina Kulchytska in 1842.

20th century 
In 1900 there were 1229 inhabitants in Shmankivtsi, in 1910, 1201; in 1921, 1127; in 1931, 1112; in 1921, 255 households; in 1931, 235.

During the First World War, residents of the village Vasyl Solodky and Franz Shinderyk joined the Legion of Ukrainian Sich Riflemen; Antin Slota fought in the Ukrainian Galician Army.

In 2019, at the 40-meter height of the tower of the Chortkiv Church, archaeologist and researcher of fortifications and antiquities Volodymyr Dobrianskyi discovered a shrapnel shell detonator, and according to its flight trajectory determined that the 1st, 3rd, 4th and 7th cannon regiments (64 guns) under the command of Ataman  during the Chortkiv offensive (June 7–28, 1919) were stationed in the woods west of the village.

In 1927–1928, many residents of Shmankiv emigrated to Canada and other countries.

For some time Shmankivtsi was the center of the commune of the same name. From August 1, 1934 to 1939, the village belonged to the Kolindiana commune.

After the Soviet annexation in September 1939, the Soviet authorities (NKVD authorities) arrested 26 villagers, including:

 Antin Baranovich,
 Miroslav Bodnaruk,
 Anton Boyko,
 Eugene Galyant,
 Luka Germak,
 Petro Germak,
 Ivan Hlukh,
 Deaf rash,
 Anna Hot,
 Anna Hot,
 Ivan the Hot,
 Ivan the Hot,
 Mikhail Goryachy,
 Alexey Hot,
 Stanislav Goryach,
 Teodor Davidyuk,
 Ivan Davydyuk,
 Ivan Krutsyk,
 Anton Sivak,
 Anton Slota,
 Olena Slota
 Mykola Stratiy,
 Ostap Fedorovich,
 Alexander Tsebrovsky,
 Vasyl Shalvytsky.

During the Second World War there was a military airfield in Shmankivtsi.

From June 1941 to March 1944, the village was under Nazi occupation.

During the German–Soviet war, 67 residents of Shmankivtsi died or went missing in the Red Army, including:

 Peter Bilyaninov (born 1923),
 Ivan Bodnar (born 1901),
 Petro Boyko (born 1899),
 Mikhail Vasilyevich Brigidir (born 1903)
 Mikhail Mikhailovich Brigidir (born 1915),
 Franko Vyshnevsky (born 1915),
 Ivan Galyant (born 1913),
 Roman Gallant (born 1919),
 Josip Germak (born 1912),
 Petro Germak (born 1906),
 Stepan Germak (born 1903),
 Anton Germanyuk (born 1909),
 Mikhail Glukh (born 1919),
 Eustace Gonta (born 1907),
 Hryhoriy Humeniuk (born 1915),
 Vasil Druk (born 1904),
 Mykola Zabiyak (born 1907),
 Adam Zakharchuk (born 1926),
 Petro Ivanchiv (born 1912),
 Joseph Ilmak (born 1915),
 Franco Ilmak (born 1924).

In 1954, a large-scale fire broke out on Strilka Street.

Period of Independence 
On May 26, 1991, the first Krasnokalinov festivals and the unveiling of the monument to Stepan Charnetsky took place.

In the night of July 4–5, 2000, a natural disaster struck the village, causing material damage to the villagers.

In 2005, Nadiya Morikvas published the book Melancholy of Stepan Charnetsky.

On November 3, 2013, residents of Strilka Street celebrated her day.

For two days, on September 3–4, 2016, in the fields of the village, a plane sprayed sunflower fields with pests from an agricultural company that leases shares from peasants from Shmankivtsi and neighboring villages. As a result, the vegetables burned, the fruit trees dropped their leaves, and several people were hospitalized with poisoning by an unknown substance.

In May 2019,  of the C201609 Shvaykivtsi-Zalissia district highway and a memorial to fellow villagers killed in the German-Soviet war were renovated in the village. On May 26, a festive prayer was held on the occasion of the 150th anniversary of the Chapel of St. Nicholas.

The first case of coronavirus disease was detected in the village on October 7, 2020. As of July 27, 2021, 55 cases were laboratory confirmed in Shmankivtsi, one of which was fatal.

Since November 27, 2020, Shmankivtsi has been part of the Zavodske settlement hromada. On November 12, 2021, the Shmankivsky Starostynsky District was formed with its center in the village of Shmankivtsi.

Religion 
 Saints Cosmas and Damian church (1895; PCU; brick)
 Saints Cosmas and Damian church (2001; UGCC; brick),
 Saint Mary Magdalene church oo. Dominicans (1912, RCC, brick, restored 1986).

Chapels 
 St. Nicholas (1869)
 worship chapel (1890, restored 2016)
 Mother of God (1990)
 on the occasion of the proclamation of Independence of Ukraine (1992)

Monuments
 Oak of Shashkevych – a natural monument named after Markiyan Shashkevych, grows near the bell tower of the Orthodox Church.
 Settlement Shmankivtsi I (Trypillia culture and ancient Russian times, 12th–13th centuries) – newly discovered objects of cultural heritage, protection number 1417.
 Settlement Shmankivtsi II (Trypillia and Chernyakhiv cultures) – newly discovered cultural heritage sites, protection number 1418.
 The settlement of Shmankivtsi III (castle site) is a newly discovered object of cultural heritage, protection number 2088.

Near the village is Fox Cave (length , sandstone).

In 1943, a grave was built in honor of the Ukrainian Sich Riflemen, who died for the freedom of Ukraine (destroyed in 1946, restored in 1990).

Other monuments include:
 three commemorative crosses, including two in honor of the abolition of serfdom in 1848;
 a memorial cross to the victims of the typhus epidemic;
 Polish memorial crosses in praise of God (1903, 1932, 1940);
 wooden cross (1919, was dug into the ground near the Castle Hill);
 grave of an unknown soldier who died in battle near the village Zalissia (1944);
 bust of Ivan Franko (1990);
 bust of Taras Shevchenko (1990);
 monument to Stepan Charnetsky (1991, sculptor Ivan Mulyarchuk, initiator of the installation Nadiya Protskiv);
 memorial to fellow villagers killed in the German-Soviet war (1992; restored 2019);
 memorial to UPA soldiers (1994);
 memorial cross to three unknown soldiers (2013);
 monument to Roman Shukhevych (2013).

Social sphere 
From 1883 to 1909 there was an oil mill and two mills in Shmankivtsi, one of which was destroyed during the First World War. With the assistance of Fr. Ivan Gordievsky the Enlightenment reading room was built, along with a savings bank and grocery store, and the Brotherhood of Sobriety was founded.

There were branches of the Ukrainian Prosvita Society, Sokol, agricultural society,  and others, as well as consumer and credit cooperatives, kindergarten, theatrical and choral circles, and a library. The Polish societies , Polish Związek Strzelecki and Dom Ludowy were active.

Until 2021, there was a house of culture and a library, which was reorganized into a studio of the Center for Cultural Services of the Factory Village Council.

Currently, the village has a school of I-II degrees, a studio of the Center for Cultural Services of the Factory Village Council, a first-aid post, and four trade establishments.

Shmankivtsi supports ancient traditions: every year on January 7 there is a nativity scene, and on January 14, Malanka.

Household 
In 1940, a collective farm was forcibly organized, which resumed its work in 1948.

Among the agricultural enterprises were the Mayak agricultural share farm, Zlagoda private agricultural enterprise, Mriya-2000 private agricultural enterprise; today there is the Parostok private agricultural enterprise.

In the village also lives a farmer, Yuri Zakharchuk, who raises astrakhan sheep and cooks cheese.

Famous people 
 Ilarion Hrabovych (1856—1903) – Ukrainian poet, literary figure, publicist, teacher.
 Stepan Charnetsky (1881–1944) – Ukrainian poet, translator, journalist, theatre and music critic, and theatre director and producer, author of the anthem of the Ukrainian Sich Riflemen "Oi u luzi chervona kalyna".

In literature 
In 2008, schoolchildren wrote a song about Shmankivtsi.

See also 
 Stavky (river)

References

Sources 
 Гуцал П., Уніят В. Шманьківці // Тернопільський енциклопедичний словник : у 4 т. / редкол.: Г. Яворський та ін. — Тернопіль : Видавничо-поліграфічний комбінат «Збруч», 2008. — Т. 3 : П — Я. — С. 645. — ISBN 978-966-528-279-2.
 Мельничук Б., Уніят В., Федечко М. Шманьківці // Тернопільщина. Історія міст і сіл : у 3 т. — Тернопіль : ТзОВ «Терно-граф», 2014. — T. 3 : М — Ш. — С. 521–522. — ISBN 978-966-457-246-7.
 Шманьківці. Чортківська округа. Історично-мемуарний збірник / ред. колегія О. Соневицької та інші. — Париж — Сидней — Торонто : НТШ, Український архів, 1974. — Т. XXVII. — С. 230–232.
 Погорецький В. Чортківщина. Історико-туристичний путівник. — Тернопіль: Астон, 2007. — С. 181. : іл. — ISBN 978-966-308-206-0
 Boniecki A. Herbarz polski: wiadomości historyczno-genealogiczne o rodach szlacheckich. — Warszawa : Warszawskie Towarzystwo Akcyjne S. Orgelbranda S[yn]ów), 1909. — Cz. 1. — T. 13. — S. 331–349. (пол.)

Links 

 
 
 Терлюк, І. Автор пісні «Ой у лузі червона калина» Степан Чарнецький — родом з Тернопільщини // Суспільне Новини. — 2022. — 18 квітня.

Shmankivtsi
Zavodske settlement hromada